Retro Review, a retro computing magazine, was the first multiformat magazine dedicated to old computers. It was irregularly published between January 2002 and March 2004.

History
It was founded by Jorge Canelhas and Ian Gledhill who also edited and published the magazine.  The first issue was published on 15 January 2002. It was a 60-page A5 magazine with a colour cover and was photocopied. From 21 January 2003 Retro Review was produced as a PDF file for subscribers in addition to print edition. On 15 March 2004 the fifth and the last issue of the magazine was published.

References

External links
 Magazine Website

Defunct computer magazines published in the United Kingdom
Downloadable magazines
Irregularly published magazines published in the United Kingdom
Magazines established in 2002
Magazines disestablished in 2004